Fried green tomatoes are a culinary dish usually found in the Southern United States, made from unripe (green) tomatoes coated with cornmeal and fried.

Traditional preparation
Traditional preparation of fried green tomatoes begins by cutting the tomatoes into approximately 1/4-inch (~0.6 cm) slices.  They are then seasoned with salt and pepper, coated with plain, coarse cornmeal, and shallow fried in bacon fat for a few minutes each side, or until golden brown.  Shallow frying is preferred, as the tomatoes do not float in the oil, which allows the weight of the tomato to press the cornmeal to the underside of the tomato.

Alternatives include using breadcrumbs or flour instead of cornmeal and frying in vegetable oil or other fat.

The sliced tomatoes may be dipped in a liquid before the cornmeal is added.  This liquid is usually buttermilk or beaten egg; egg results in a slightly firmer texture than buttermilk.  Liquids are used because cornmeal does not readily stick to tomato slices. Adding the liquid helps the cornmeal stay in place during the cooking process.  It also results in the coating on the tomato becoming thicker and less crunchy when compared to tomatoes cooked without a liquid wash.

Pennsylvania Dutch version
While fried green tomatoes are usually considered a southern dish they can be found in northern Pennsylvania Dutch homes as well. The northern version is more likely to be made with white flour rather than corn meal. Also, green tomatoes tend to be prepared at the end of the season in the north when the remaining fruit is harvested before the first frosts, whereas green tomatoes are picked throughout the season in the south.

Other preparations

Fried green tomatoes with shrimp remoulade is a southern and Creole combination served at many restaurants in New Orleans, Louisiana.

While fried green tomatoes have traditionally been a side dish, they are sometimes used in main dishes:
 Fried Green Tomato Po'Boy
 Fried Green Tomato Parmesan
 Fried Green Tomato Benedict

See also
 Cuisine of the Southern United States
 List of tomato dishes

References

External links

Cuisine of the Southern United States
Tomato dishes
Pennsylvania Dutch cuisine
Fried foods